Fort Macomb is a 19th-century United States brick fort in Louisiana, on the western shore of Chef Menteur Pass. It is listed on the National Register of Historic Places. The fort is adjacent to the Venetian Isles community, now legally within the city limits of New Orleans, Louisiana. This community was some miles distant from the city when first built and is still distant from the main developed portion of the city.

History

Chef Menteur Pass is a water route from the Gulf of Mexico to Lake Pontchartrain and the lakeshore of New Orleans. (The other route is the Rigolets; both straits connect Pontchartrain to the Gulf via Lake Borgne.) An earlier fort at the site was called Fort Chef Menteur.

The United States built the current brick fort in 1822, just seven years after British forces invaded the New Orleans area from the sea, at the close of the War of 1812. It was named Fort Wood in 1827 renamed Fort Macomb in 1851, for General Alexander Macomb, former Chief of Engineers and the second Commanding General of the United States Army.

The small fort shaped like a pie wedge has a curved front facing the channel; the curve overlaps the two straight walls, forming demi-bastions. At the salient of the two straight walls is a full bastion facing landward. The fort was surrounded by two wet ditches (moats) with extensive outworks between the ditches. On the parade stands a citadel, a defensive barracks.

A Louisiana garrison took control of and occupied the fort starting on 28 January 1861 early in the American Civil War. In 1862 the Union Army regained control of the fort and also occupied New Orleans.

In 1867 the barracks caught fire, after which the fort was largely abandoned by the U.S. Army. It was decommissioned in 1871.

Preservation 
The fort and its land are now owned by the State of Louisiana. While some efforts were made to open it to limited tourism in the late 20th century, the decaying condition of the fort was judged too hazardous for public visits. (currently closed for budget reasons.)

A portion of the fort's old moat had been turned into a canal as part of a small marina. The wakes from incoming and outgoing boats were wearing away the outer wall of the fort and accelerating the structural damage. Hurricane Katrina destroyed the marina in 2005. The fort is now protected by riprap. It needs structural stabilization to reverse the previous damage.

Filming location 
The climax of the first-season finale of the 2014 television series True Detective was filmed on location at Fort Macomb.
This site is also a filming location for the television series Into the Badlands in 2015.
In 2016, Beyoncé filmed portions of her critically acclaimed visual album, Lemonade, at Fort Macomb.
Episode 17 of Season 4 of NCIS:New Orleans  used the location for a concluding scene.

See also
Fort Pike

References

External links

 Forts Macomb and Pike, Civil War Album website

History of New Orleans
Macomb
Louisiana in the American Civil War
Government buildings completed in 1822
Infrastructure completed in 1822
Buildings and structures in New Orleans
Macomb
National Register of Historic Places in New Orleans
1822 establishments in Louisiana